SOCOM U.S. Navy SEALs is a tactical shooter video game developed by Zipper Interactive and published by Sony Computer Entertainment for PlayStation 2.

In addition to the 12 offline single player missions, SOCOM also featured online play via the Internet. SOCOM uses a USB headset for its speech recognition commands offline, and allows voice chat with teammates when playing online; this was the first game for the PlayStation 2 to use the headset. As of November 6, 2003, the game has sold two million copies worldwide.

The online servers for this game, along with other PlayStation 2 and PlayStation Portable SOCOM titles, were shut down on August 31, 2012.

Gameplay
The player leads a four-man team (three AI-controlled teammates) of United States Navy SEALs through 12 missions in four regions: Alaska, Thailand, Congo, and Turkmenistan in the then-future of 2006 and 2007. In the single player missions, commands can be spoken using the included USB headset or via an onscreen menu if the optional SOCOM headset was not purchased. Typical missions consist of killing terrorists, rescuing hostages, retrieving intelligence, or destroying terrorist bases.

The player character's codename is Kahuna, while the NPC teammates' codenames are Boomer, Spectre and Jester. The team is divided into two sub-groups, Alpha and Bravo. The Alpha group consists of the player and Boomer (the Able element), while the remaining two make up Bravo. Commands can be issued to both individuals and a whole group, for example it is possible to ask team Bravo to remain stationary while the player is scouting the area with Boomer. However the player can not venture alone through a map, when Kahuna is too far away from Boomer he will automatically resume following the player, regardless of prior orders. Briefings and intel such as maps and photos are given prior to each mission.

Before each mission, the player may choose new equipment for themself and their teammates. Usually this consists of a primary and secondary weapon, along with two pieces of equipment like extra ammunition, explosives and so on. However, on some missions it is required that a team member carries a particular piece of equipment, such as C4 for destroying walls or vehicles. Characters are very vulnerable to enemy fire and may die after just a couple of shots, depending on where one is hit and what weapon is used. It is required that at least one teammate survives along with the player, if not the mission fails.

At the end of each mission, the player is given a rating based on stealth, accuracy and teamwork. These ratings are alphabetical, with "A" being the highest grade. Once the game is completed for the first time, the player unlocks a higher difficulty and can try to complete the game again and again with a progressively higher difficulty.

Online gameplay
Online players choose one of two sides: SEALs or terrorists. Maps consist of three types: suppression (eliminate all members of the opposite team), extraction (rescue hostages) and demolition (capture a satchel and destroy the opposite team's base). SOCOM, SOCOM U.S. Navy SEALs: Confrontation and SOCOM 4: U.S. Navy SEALs for the PlayStation 3 are the only games in the series that do not support LAN play (local multiplayer). In addition to the specific game type, any of the three game modes may be won by eliminating all members of the opposing team. The online features of the game, however, are no longer accessible.

Plot
On November 27, 2006, a U.S. Navy SEAL fireteam consisting of Kahuna, Boomer, Spectre, and Jester is sent in to neutralize an emerging terrorist threat. A new group calling itself the Iron Brotherhood, made up of former Spetsnaz operatives, is using a barge as a base for buying and transporting weapons. They are making their trades with a known black market organization, the Zemy, and the two are rendezvousing in international waters off the coast of Alaska. The team are to eliminate the terrorists, gather intel, and scuttle the freighter. With the intel that the SEALs gathered, SOCOM is able to locate the Brotherhood's headquarters, a ghost town in Alaska. The team is tasked with securing the compound, destroying any weapon caches that are present, and detaining a terrorist named Kola Petrenko, codename Pincushion. Information from Pincushion revealed that the Brotherhood has taken control of an oil platform in the Alaskan Beaufort Sea. Most of the oil workers had been killed, but some are being held captive by the terrorists. The Brotherhood is also threatening to destroy the platform, which would result in a disastrous oil spill. The SEALs are sent in to infiltrate the platform and neutralize all threats, including the Brotherhood's leader, Stanislav, codename Spectrum. They are successful in taking down all of the terrorists and defusing all bombs on board.

In Thailand, a group calling themselves the Riddah Rouge, led by a man named Sudarak Thongkon, has acquired sensitive and highly valuable biological data from a smuggler out of Sri Lanka. The terrorists murder him and his crew, then offload the data and move it deep into the jungles of Thailand. With a potential biological threat on their soil, the Thai government requests for international assistance, and the United States responds by sending in the SEALs. Kahuna's team are inserted into the area and proceed to travel upriver to intercept and retrieve the data. After moving from one island to another and neutralizing numerous patrols, the team finds some documents. Unfortunately, only half of the bio data is among them as the other half had been moved elsewhere. With the bio data in their possession, the Riddah Rouge has taken the U.S. Ambassador to Thailand and his wife hostage. The terrorists demand ransom money and threaten to execute the two if their demands are not met. Intelligence tracks their movements and are able to locate the hostages at an abandoned temple in the jungles of Hohn Kaen. The team move in under cover of night and safely extract the Ambassador and his wife. While no ransom is paid for the pair, the Riddah Rouge manage to manufacture a small amount of biological agent. Their plan is to use the agents to destabilize the Thai government. The SEALs are assigned to assault another abandoned temple. While there, the team either captures or kills Thongkon, codename Bad Dog, and secures the biological agents. With their leader in custody, the Riddah Rouge disbanded.

In the Congo, a new mercenary organization known as Preemptive Strike has established a base of operations deep in the jungle. They are recruiting European mercenaries and are actively stockpiling weapons and ammunition. Concerned about this new threat, the Congolese government has requested aid from the United States. The SEALs are sent in to recon and collect intel about the group. After disabling communications and destroying the enemy munitions in their staging area, the team finds out that the remaining mercenaries have ambushed and captured a patrol of U.S. Marines. The marines are being held at the mercenary base camp where they are being tortured for information. The SEALs are able to rescue the POWs and eliminate the mercenary leader Magnus, but not before finding out that one of the captive Marines is missing, having been moved to an abandoned German bunker built during World War I which contains a network of tunnels and pillboxes. This complex is no match for the SEALs however, and they successfully liberate the final Marine with the help of U.S. Navy F/A-18 fighter jets firing missiles at designated pillboxes.

In Turkmenistan, members of a terrorist group, the Allah Sadikahu, have attained several portable nuclear devices from various black market organizations. An informant named Basim Maccek, codename Mr. Pickle, has knowledge about the nuclear devices moving through the region, but has gotten himself captured in the process. He is imprisoned in a Turkmen Detention Center in the mountains and the SEALs are sent in to release, escort, and extract the informant. The recovered informant confirms the presence of two suitcase nukes in Turkmenistan and their location. The Sadikahu have concealed the devices in a desert cave network close to the Afghan border. With no time to lose, the team travels to the nukes' location. After an intensive firefight, the team manages to destroy the nukes and the cave system. The Sadikahu's ruthless leader Mullah Bahir Al-Qadi, however, is not present at the caves. He and his brother Imad have retreated to a deserted bombed city in central Turkmenistan. Kahuna's team is once again sent in to find and neutralize the Al-Qadi brothers. The SEALs fight against countless terrorist defenders and race against the clock as Mullah and Imad Al-Qadi, codename Fat Cat and Kitten, call for helicopters to come and extract them.

In the end, both brothers are killed and the mission is completed.

Development

The game was in development for three years.

Reception

SOCOM U.S. Navy SEALs received "generally positive" reviews, according to review aggregator Metacritic. GameSpot named it the best PlayStation 2 game of August 2002. It won GameSpots annual "Best Online Game on PlayStation 2" award, and a runner-up for "Best Sound on PlayStation 2".

By July 2006, SOCOM U.S. Navy SEALs had sold 1.4 million copies and earned $82 million in the United States. Next Generation ranked it as the 34th highest-selling game launched for the PlayStation 2, Xbox or GameCube between January 2000 and July 2006 in that country. Combined sales of SOCOM releases reached 3.9 million units in the United States by July 2006.

References

External links
 

2002 video games
Microphone-controlled computer games
Multiplayer and single-player video games
PlayStation 2 games
PlayStation 2-only games
SOCOM 1
Video games about the United States Navy SEALs
Video games developed in the United States
Video games scored by Jeremy Soule
Video games set in the 2010s
Video games set in Alaska
Video games set in the Democratic Republic of the Congo
Video games set in Thailand
Video games set in Turkmenistan
Zipper Interactive games